Puerta del Sur is a station on Line 10 and Line 12 of the Madrid Metro. It is located in fare Zone B1. As entering Puerta del Sur is considered to be synonymous with entering Metrosur (Line 12), all passengers who leave Puerta del Sur station must have valid tickets for fare Zone B1, which includes parts of Line 12.

References 

Line 10 (Madrid Metro) stations
Line 12 (Madrid Metro) stations
Railway stations in Spain opened in 2003
Buildings and structures in Alcorcón